The LB&SCR K class were powerful 2-6-0 mixed traffic locomotives designed by L. B. Billinton for the London, Brighton and South Coast Railway (LB&SCR) in 1913. They appeared shortly before the First World War and the first ten examples of the class did prodigious work during that conflict on munitions, supply and troop trains. Further examples were built after the war, and the class was used as a test bed for various items of specialised equipment. However, after the formation of the Southern Railway in 1923 the remaining three locomotives on order were not completed and the seventeen members of the class led relatively quiet yet reliable lives over their traditional lines. The locomotives proved their usefulness once again during the Second World War, and continued to provide reliable service until the 1960s. The entire class was eventually withdrawn in 1962 for 'bookkeeping' rather than 'operational' reasons.

Background

Due to the nature of its traffic, the LB&SCR had relatively limited need of heavy freight locomotives. However, those it did have had to be able to accelerate quickly from sidings and signals and maintain a good speed if they were not going to impede the intensive use of the lines for passenger traffic, particularly in the London suburbs. This issue became increasingly problematic after about 1910, as more and more suburban lines were electrified. The rebuilding of Robert Billinton's C2 class with larger boilers by D. E. Marsh solved this problem for a few years, but traffic continued to grow and by 1913 these were occasionally being double-headed. A larger and more powerful design was required for the heaviest freight trains, whilst there was also a continuing need for larger passenger locomotives, especially during the summer months. Lawson Billinton therefore ordered from Brighton works five powerful mixed-traffic locomotives which could cope with both types of load.

Design

The new 'K' class incorporated several innovations for the LB&SCR. They were the first 2-6-0 locomotives to run on the railway, and the first class to have a Belpaire firebox. They were fitted with Robinson style superheaters within a parallel boiler and two large inclined outside cylinders with Stephenson valve gear. The boilers were fed by hot water injectors, operated by a Weir pump, and surplus steam fed back to the tenders to preheat the water. The tenders were the largest of any LB&SCR locomotive with a capacity of 3,940 gallons of water and 4 tons of coal. The class was also fitted with steam sanding and steam carriage heating equipment enabling them to be used on passenger trains.

Construction and use

The first two examples, numbers 337 and 338, appeared in traffic in September and December 1913, and were thoroughly tested at Brighton motive power depot. Modifications were made to the suspension of the pony truck and to the smokebox layout before three further examples (Nos. 339-341) with slightly larger smokeboxes were built between March and September 1914. The design was quickly judged to be successful and a further five were ordered, but due to the difficulties of obtaining materials during World War I they did not appear in traffic until late 1916. The last two locomotives were fitted with Billinton's own 'top feed' system which provided a moderate increase in performance and so the remainder of the class was gradually fitted with the equipment as they passed through the workshops.

The original ten locomotives proved to be extremely useful during the First World War, hauling heavy munitions and military supply trains from the marshalling yard at Three Bridges to Newhaven or Littlehampton harbours. Up to sixty supply trains a day were being handled by these two ports. Locomotives in the class were capable of hauling trains of up to 1,000 tons at 30-35 mph, but were equally useful when hauling troop trains. The railway would have liked to have added to their number, but wartime restrictions on locomotive building prevented this.

Billinton considered designing a 2-6-2 tank engine 'K2' or 'N' version after the war, but this idea was dropped following discussions with the railway's Civil Engineer, who objected to the longer wheelbase necessary, together with the discovery that the tank engine version would only be able to carry 2,000 gallons of water. Therefore, a further ten locomotives of the original design were ordered from Brighton works. Seven of these (nos. 347-353) appeared in traffic between December 1920 and March 1921. Progress on the remaining three locomotives was delayed due to the long backlog of repairs at Brighton works, and eventually a decision about their completion was deferred until after the imminent grouping of the railways of southern England to form the Southern Railway in January 1923. In the end they were never completed.

Variants

During the last years of the LB&SCR, Billinton used members of the class to test various items of specialised equipment, most of which later proved to give limited advantage in return for higher fuel consumption or maintenance costs. In April 1921, the smokebox of No. 351 was extended to fit a 'Lewis Draft Appliance', which was removed in 1927. In March 1922, Nos. 341 and 342 were experimentally fitted with an early version of the Kylala variable blastpipe. One locomotive appeared to perform better as a result and the other worse, and so the experiment was discontinued. Between May 1922 and December 1923, No. 340 had a Worthington-Simpson feed-water heater and pump. Finally in February 1923, No. 341 was fitted with 'Lamberts wet sanding gear' but this equipment was removed in 1931 after it was found to cause additional wear on the driving wheels.

Post-grouping

The class was initially renumbered by means of adding the prefix, 'B' to the original number, and later by adding 2000 to the LB&SCR number. They spent the first six years of Southern Railway ownership largely restricted to the lines of the Central Section, as the LB&SCR previously had a more generous loading gauge than the other main constituent companies. However, between 1929 and the summer of 1939 all the members of the class were altered to the composite gauge by reducing the height of their chimneys, flattening the dome and reducing the cab roofs, as they passed through the works.

During the spring of 1924, the class was compared with other classes of heavy freight locomotives operated by the constituent companies. They were found to be capable and reliable but more expensive to run than the alternative Maunsell N and Urie S15 classes and so no more were built. This may have been a false economy since many of the 'N' class ultimately had to undergo expensive rebuilding of their frames and the replacement of their cylinders, whereas members of the 'K' class remained in sound working order throughout their working lives.

The seventeen examples spent most of their careers between the two World Wars working on both freight and passenger duties over their traditional routes, although there was less need for the latter following the electrification of the Brighton Main Line in 1933. However, the class once again came into its own during the Second World War when the locomotives were again used on heavy freight and troop trains throughout the Southern Railway, especially in the lead up to the D-day landings in 1944.

British Railways

All of the class were in good working order at the time of the nationalisation of the British Railways in 1948, and continued to be well maintained until the latter half of 1961. They were renumbered by adding 30000 to the SR number. Between 1949 and 1953 the feedwater heating was replaced by cold water injection, for reasons of cost, and latterly many examples were fitted with Automatic Warning System equipment, and water treatment equipment. With the reduction in freight traffic, they began to be also used on secondary services. However, after the summer of 1956 the class also acquired one prestige passenger duty on the Newhaven boat-trains, following the withdrawal of the 'Marsh Atlantics'.

Accidents and incidents
On 3 March 1954, No. 32346 derailed at the catch points near Forest Row and landed on its left side at the embankment.

Withdrawal
The locomotives were all still providing good reliable service when the class was withdrawn en-bloc during November and December 1962, apparently as part of an accountancy exercise 'to keep in line with the Southern Regions' withdrawal programme'. Most spent several months in store at Hove railway station before being broken up, and at least one had to be briefly resurrected to help run breakdown trains during the severe Winter of 1962–1963 in the United Kingdom.  The early Bluebell Railway had hoped to purchase one example for preservation, but could not afford to do so since the time when they were available coincided with the years when all money had to be channelled into the purchase of the freehold of the line.

Model
Lawson Billinton considered the 'K' class to be his finest design, and during his retirement he constructed a one-sixth size working model from the original drawings. This was last sold in 2003 for a price in the £40-£50,000 range.

Assessment

Members of the 'K' class were considered the best mixed-traffic locomotives produced by the LB&SCR, but they never achieved the fame of the earlier passenger or tank engine classes of that railway and they had little impact on future Southern Railway locomotive design. It was only during the two World Wars that they were given the opportunity to show their true potential.

Locomotive Summary

Liveries
The class have been painted in a variety of different liveries during their careers, reflecting their mixed-traffic role. For the initial trials nos. 337 and 338 were painted in red oxide, and after acceptance they were painted in dove grey, lined with black and white for the official photographs (see above). Thereafter members of the class were painted plain black by the LB&SCR. Under Southern Railway ownership three examples were painted in lined umber, and others in passenger green and lined black. During the Second World War they were either painted in unlined dark green or black. Under British Railways the usual livery was lined black.

References

External links

 Southern e-group article

2-6-0 locomotives
K
Railway locomotives introduced in 1913
Scrapped locomotives
Standard gauge steam locomotives of Great Britain